Malcolm Thomas Holloway (22 December 1956 – 3 May 2012) was a speedway rider and speedway promoter from England.

Speedway career 
Holloway reached the final of the British Speedway Championship in 1982. He rode in the top tier of British Speedway from 1977–2004, riding for various clubs.

He went on to be the promoter at Reading Racers.

References 

1956 births
2012 deaths
British speedway riders
Mildenhall Fen Tigers riders
Milton Keynes Knights riders
Oxford Cheetahs riders
Reading Racers riders
Somerset Rebels riders
Swindon Robins riders
Trelawny Tigers riders